Midlife: A Beginner's Guide to Blur is a two-disc compilation album by Blur, released by EMI Records on . It is Blur's second retrospective collection, succeeding 2000's Blur: The Best Of and coincides with the band's 2009 reunion performances.

Background
Spanning the breadth of Blur's recorded history from its inception, Midlife: A Beginner's Guide to Blur features a larger sampling of material from 1993's Modern Life Is Rubbish (including the single-only "Popscene" from the same era) than on Blur: The Best Of, in addition to material from 2003's Think Tank, Blur's second most recent studio release, coming out before 2015's The Magic Whip.

Track listing
All songs written by Blur (Albarn/Coxon/James/Rowntree), except for "Out of Time" and "Good Song", which were written by Albarn/James/Rowntree.

Personnel

Musicians
 Damon Albarn – vocals, keyboards, acoustic guitar
 Graham Coxon – guitars, backing vocals, lead vocals on "Coffee & TV", co-lead vocals on "Tender" (not featured on "Out of Time" or "Good Song")
 Alex James – bass
 Dave Rowntree – drums

Other personnel
 Blur – Producer
 Jack Clark – Mixing Assistant
 Al Clay – Mixing
 Jason Cox – Engineer
 Tom Girling – Assistant Producer
 Stephen Hague – Producer, Engineer
 Ben Hillier – Producer, Mixing
 Jeff Knowler – Assistant Engineer
 Damian leGassick – Programming
 Steve Lovell – Producer
 Gerard Navarro – Assistant Engineer
 William Orbit – Producer, Engineer
 James Oliver – Design
 Steve Power – Producer
 Iain Roberton – Assistant Engineer
 Andy Ross – Engineer
 John Smith – Producer, Engineer
 Sean Spuehler – Programming
 Stephen Street – Producer, Engineer

Charts and certifications

Weekly charts

Certifications

References

External links

Midlife: A Beginner's Guide to Blur at YouTube (streamed copy where licensed)

2009 greatest hits albums
Blur (band) albums
Albums produced by Stephen Street
Albums produced by William Orbit
Albums produced by Ben Hillier
Parlophone compilation albums